Howz Gholam Kesh Castle is a historical castle located in Birjand County in South Khorasan Province, The longevity of this fortress dates back to the 7th and 8th centuries AH.

References 

Castles in Iran